Aleksandr Aleksandrovich Stavpets (born 4 July 1989) is a Russian footballer. He plays for FC Arsenal Tula.

Club career
He made his Russian Premier League debut for FC Rostov on 16 July 2007 in a game against FC Saturn Ramenskoye.

Career statistics

Notes

External links
  Player page on the official FC Moscow website
 

1989 births
Sportspeople from Oryol
Living people
Russian footballers
Russia youth international footballers
Russia under-21 international footballers
Association football midfielders
FC Rostov players
FC Moscow players
PFC Krylia Sovetov Samara players
FC Ural Yekaterinburg players
FC Rotor Volgograd players
FC Tyumen players
FC Tom Tomsk players
FC Nizhny Novgorod (2015) players
FC Arsenal Tula players
Russian Premier League players
Russian First League players